Gertrude Rhinelander Waldo (May 12, 1842 – May 27, 1914) was an American heiress known for commissioning the Rhinelander Mansion located in Manhattan at 867 Madison Avenue on the south-east corner of 72nd Street, designed in the 1890s by Kimball & Thompson and completed in 1898.  According to most sources, she never lived in the mansion, but chose to reside with her sister in a row house across the street from the mansion.

Early life
Gertrude was born in New York on May 12, 1842.  She was the youngest of seven children born to Bernard Rhinelander (1800–1844) and Nancy Elizabeth Mary (née Post) Rhinelander (1806–1895) and was descended from a family that had resided in New York City since the 17th century.  Her older siblings included Charles Edward Rhinelander, who married Mathilda Frances Cotheal; Emily Rhinelander, who married Dr. John Watson; and Laura Virginia Rhinelander, who did not marry.

Her maternal grandparents were U.S. Representative Jotham Post Jr. and his second wife, Magdalen (née Blaau) Post. Her paternal grandparents were William Rhinelander and Mary (née Robert) Rhinelander.  Rhinelander's great-great grandfather, Philip Jacob Rhinelander, was a German-born French Huguenot who immigrated to the United States in 1686 following the revocation of the Edict of Nantes, settling in the newly formed French Huguenot community of New Rochelle, where he amassed considerable property holdings which became the basis for the Rhinelander family's wealth.

Personal life
On June 6, 1876, she married stockbroker Francis William "Frank" Waldo (1836–1878), despite the fact that he had been bankrupted during the Panic of 1873.  In May 1877, before Frank's untimely death in 1878, she gave birth to:

 Rhinelander Waldo (1877–1927), who became the Fire and Police Commissioner of New York.

In 1882, she received an inheritance valued at $360,000 (equivalent to $ today) that consisted largely of real estate.  By 1889, she had reportedly been in a relationship with lawyer Charles H. Schieffelin.  She sued him in 1899 to reclaim $12,000 (equivalent to $ today) she said he had misappropriated from her that he said he was going to invest the money in various railroad securities.  In a counterclaim, Schieffelin said that he had invested the money as directed and that the two of them were going to be married.  Waldo responded that she would never have married Schieffelin because of his earlier divorce.

Gertrude died of apoplexy on May 27, 1914.  After a funeral at the Hotel Netherland, she was buried at Sleepy Hollow Cemetery in Sleepy Hollow, New York.  In 1915, The New York Times reported that at the time of her death, she was over $135,000 (equivalent to $ today) in debt, consisting primarily of a pair of loans she received from the L. V. Rhinelander Estate.

72nd Street residence

She bought a piece of property located at the corner of 72nd Street and Madison Avenue in 1882, announcing plans to construct a home that one journal called "quite unique in design". However, she did not go ahead with construction and lived with her sister Laura for many years in a row house on the opposite side of 72nd Street. Construction of the mansion was started in 1894 while she was living at the Savoy Hotel. She sold some of the property that she had inherited around 1896 and used the proceeds to cover a portion of the construction costs of two new adjoining homes on the property, which totaled $340,000, with the remaining balance in a $195,000 mortgage. Completed by 1898, the four-story house, which included a ballroom lit by 1,000 light bulbs and furnished at a cost of $1 million, was never occupied during Gertrude Rhinelander Waldo's life.  It was assumed Gertrude would move in upon returning from a European trip in 1898 (when construction was nearing completion), but not only did she not move into the residence, much of the rare European furnishings were never unpacked, and remained in the crates on the lower floors, as they came from the steamer.

Later, facing financial difficulties including owing large amounts on the two homes, Rhinelander reached an agreement to sell the house through a broker, but reneged on the deal when the papers effecting the transfer were ready to be signed, and said "I don't think I'll sell" and walked out on the offer. By December 1909, it was announced that the dilapidated structure was to be placed up for auction January 12, 1910, in order to satisfy a $10,000 judgment, $9,221 in unpaid taxes, and a prior $150,000 mortgage. According to available articles, Rhinelander was apparently able to re-purchase the property and two houses at auction and retain ownership for one more year, though they remained unoccupied and non-revenue generating.

In September 1911, Rhinelander finally let one of the mansions go at foreclosure, the smaller 72nd Street house, in order to partially cover judgments against her. In exchange for loans to further reduce her obligations, Rhinelander also transferred ownership of the larger Madison Avenue home to her unmarried sister, Laura, along with other property that Waldo owned in Lower Manhattan on Washington Street and Barclay Street.

Legacy
The Rhinelander Mansion was vacant until 1921 when it was subdivided into commercial use on the street level and two apartments on the four floors above. It now houses the flagship men's clothing store of Polo Ralph Lauren that took 18 months to renovate in 1983 at a published cost of $14–15 million.

References

External links

1837 births
1914 deaths
People from the Upper East Side
American socialites
Burials at Sleepy Hollow Cemetery